Paolo Lorenzi (born 15 December 1981) is an Italian former professional tennis player. Lorenzi was coached by Claudio Galoppini.

Tennis career

Lorenzi reached his first ATP World Tour final at the age of 32, in São Paulo. Here, at the 2014 Brasil Open, the Italian reached the semifinals of an ATP Tour tournament for the first time, upsetting Juan Mónaco in three sets; then progressing to the final after the retirement of Tommy Haas in the second set of their semifinal match. He went on to lose the final to Argentine Federico Delbonis in three sets.

On 22 May 2015, after defeating Matthew Ebden in the quarterfinals of the Eskişehir Cup, Lorenzi became the third player ever to win 300 matches in the ATP Challenger Tour tournaments.

At age 34, on 24 July 2016, Lorenzi earned his first ATP Tour title after beating Nikoloz Basilashvili at the Generali Open Kitzbühel. On August 1, 2016 he overtook Fabio Fognini becoming the new Italian #1 in the Association of Tennis Professionals ATP ranking at the age of 34 years old and 8 months at No. 40. 

He was the 32nd seed in the 2017 Miami Open but lost in the 2nd round. He also entered 2017 Wimbledon Championships as the 32nd seed where he recorded his first win by beating Horacio Zeballos in four sets, he then advanced to the 2nd round where he lost to Jared Donaldson in 4 sets.

Lorenzi recorded the best grand slam singles performance of his career, reaching the round of 16 at the 2017 US Open. He lost to eventual runner-up Kevin Anderson in four sets.

Lorenzi lost in the third round of qualifying of the 2019 US Open, but received an invitation to compete in the main draw as a lucky loser upon the withdrawal of Kevin Anderson due to injury. In the first round, he came from two sets down to win in five against Zachary Svajda. In the second round he defeated Miomir Kecmanović in five sets to advance to the third round of the US Open for the second time in his career. He was defeated by Stan Wawrinka in the third round.

At age 39, on 26 August 2021, Lorenzi retired from professional tennis. His final match was a loss to Maxime Janvier in the second round of the 2021 US Open Qualifying Tournament.

ATP career finals

Singles: 4 (1 title, 3 runner-ups)

Doubles: 3 (1 title, 2 runner-ups)

Challenger and Futures finals

Singles: 44 (25–19)

Doubles: 12 (9–5)

Performance timelines

Singles

Doubles

References

External links
 
 
 
 
 

1981 births
Living people
Tennis players from Rome
Italian male tennis players
Tennis players at the 2016 Summer Olympics
Olympic tennis players of Italy